The Ramla subdistrict is one of Israel's subdistricts in Central District. The district is composed of mostly of the Eastern half of Mandatory Ramle Subdistrict.

There are three principal cities in the subdistrict:1. as the name of the subdistrict implies, Ramla, 2. Lod, and 3. Modi'in-Maccabim-Re'ut

References